Pongidae , or the pongids is an obsolete primate taxon containing chimpanzees, gorillas and orangutans. By this definition pongids were also called "great apes". This taxon is not used today but is of historical significance. The great apes are currently classified as Hominidae. This entry addresses the old usage of pongid.

The words "Pongidae" and "pongids" are sometimes used informally for the primate taxon containing orangutans and their extinct fossil relations. For this usage the currently most widely accepted name is Ponginae (or informally Asian hominids or pongines), the orangutan subfamily of the Hominidae or hominids. In current hominid taxonomy there is no “pongid” taxon. The orangutan taxon is now known to be paraphyletic to other (African) hominids. The orangutans are the only surviving species of the subfamily Ponginae, which genetically diverged from the other hominids (gorillas, chimpanzees and humans) between 19.3 and 15.7 million years ago. The subfamilies split somewhat later. The corresponding crown group for this taxon is Hominidae.

Distinction of great apes (formerly pongids) to hominins

Skull
The great ape (formerly pongid) skull contains the following features that are absent or less pronounced in humans:
 a sulcus behind the brow ridges
 prognathism
 a protruding occipital region
 large, bony eye sockets
 a large nasal opening
 constriction just behind the orbital region
 stout facial bones
 a diastema
 a simian shelf
 a more larger, well pronounced brow ridge

Adaptations for locomotion
The following great ape (formerly Pongid) adaptations are for arboreal and knuckle walking locomotion and are not found in humans:

Similarity to hominins
The australopithecines show intermediate character states between great apes (formerly pongids) and humans, with Homo erectus (formerly Pithecanthropus) intermediate between australopithecines and humans. Members of the genus Homo share many key features with anatomically modern man.

See also

 Anoiapithecus
 Chororapithecus
 History of hominoid taxonomy

 Pierolapithecus
 Samburupithecus

References

 Science and faith: The hominid fossil record

External links
 Pongidae - the Great Apes Family
 Brain endocast asymmetry in pongids

Apes
Primate families
Obsolete primate taxa
Paraphyletic groups